The National Slavic Museum in Fell's Point, Baltimore is a museum dedicated to the documentation of the Polish and Slavic heritage of Baltimore, including Baltimore's Belarusian, Bulgarian, Carpatho-Rusyn, Croatian, Czech, Lemko, Moravian, Russian, Serbian, Slovak, Slovene, and Ukrainian heritage.

See also
 History of the Czechs in Baltimore
 History of the Poles in Baltimore
 History of the Russians in Baltimore
 History of the Ukrainians in Baltimore

References

External links

Museum, a First, Has a Past

2012 establishments in Maryland
Belarusian-American history
Bulgarian-American history
Croatian-American culture
Czech-American culture in Baltimore
Ethnic museums in Maryland
European-American museums
Fell's Point, Baltimore
Lemko American
Museums established in 2012
Museums in Baltimore
Polish-American culture in Baltimore
Russian-American culture in Baltimore
Rusyn-American culture in Maryland
Serbian-American culture
Slavic-American history
Slovak-American culture in Maryland
Slovene-American history
Ukrainian-American culture in Baltimore